The 2001–02 West Midlands (Regional) League season was the 102nd in the history of the West Midlands (Regional) League, an English association football competition for semi-professional and amateur teams based in the West Midlands county, Shropshire, Herefordshire, Worcestershire and southern Staffordshire.

Premier Division

The Premier Division featured 22 clubs which competed in the division last season, along with two new clubs:
Ledbury Town, promoted from Division One South
Wolverhampton United, promoted from Division One North

Also, Brierley Hill Town changed name to Brierley & Hagley and Warley Rangers changed name to Smethwick Rangers.

League table

References

External links

2001–02
9